Faisal Yousef (Arabic:فيصل يوسف) (born 7 January 1996) is an Emirati footballer. He currently plays as a right back.

Career

Al-Ahli
Faisal Yousef started his career at Al-Ahli and is a product of the Al-Ali's youth system.

Shabab Al-Ahli
He was playing with Al-Ahli and after merging Al Ahli, Al-Shabab and Dubai clubs under the name Shabab Al-Ahli Club he was joined to Shabab Al-Ali.

Al Dhafra
On 24 December 2017, he left Shabab Al-Ali and signed with Al-Dhafra . On 8 February 2018, Faisal Yousef made his professional debut for Al-Dhafra against Dibba Al-Fujairah in the Pro League.

Al-Fujairah
On 2 October 2018, he left Al-Dhafra and signed with Al-Fujairah. On 23 February 2019, Faisal Yousef made his professional debut for Al-Fujairah against Ajman in the Pro League.

References

External links
 

1996 births
Living people
Emirati footballers
Al Ahli Club (Dubai) players
Shabab Al-Ahli Club players
Al Dhafra FC players
Fujairah FC players
Dibba Al-Hisn Sports Club players
UAE Pro League players
Association football fullbacks
Place of birth missing (living people)